Plasma Science Society of India was founded in 1979 at Institute for Plasma Research, Ahmedabad in India for the benefit of the fusion community working on plasma. This serves the thrive for knowledge towards the fusion research in the field of theoretical and experimental research . The devices are SST-1, SINP-Tokamak, AdityaTokamak. There are over 950 life-member of this society along with number of annual members.

References

External links

Nuclear fusion
Scientific organisations based in India